Y'a ben du changement (There's a Lot of Change) is a 1978 album by La Bottine Souriante.

Track listing
 "Sur la montagne du loup" (On Wolf Mountain),  – 4:10
 "Trinque l'amourette" (Toast to a Love Affair),  – 3:51
 "La ronfleuse Gobeil" (The Snoring Gobeil,  – 4:01
 "Pinci-Pincette",  – 4:46
 "Y'a ben du changement" (There's a Lot of Change),  – 4:17
 "2033 (Le Manifeste d'un vieux chasseur d'oïes)" (2033 [Manifesto of an Old Goose Hunter]),  – 4:10
 "La Banqueroute" (Bankruptcy),  – 3:30
 "Réel des ouvriers" (Workers' Reel),  – 2:41
 "L'Ivrogne" (The Drunkard),  – 3:42
 "Sur la grand côte" (On the Great Hill),  – 1:51
 "La Tuque rouge" (The Red Tuque),  – 2:59
 "Le Réel à bouche acadien" (Acadian Mouth Reel),  – 1:38

Footnotes

References

1978 debut albums
La Bottine Souriante albums